Raphaël Vienot (31 August 1804 – 2 May 1855) was colonel of the French Army who particularly illustrated himself during the Crimean War and was killed in action while leading the assault of his regiment.

Military career 
Born in Fontainebleau in 1804,  Raphaël Vienot was admitted to the École spéciale militaire de Saint-Cyr in 1823, after nine years of studies at the Prytanée National Militaire of La Flèche. He graduated as a sous-lieutenant and was assigned to the 4th Line Infantry Regiment where he served for more than twenty years. 

In 1846, Vienot was designated as chef de bataillon at the 20th Light Infantry Regiment. In 1852 he joined the 1st Foreign Regiment 1er RE of the French Foreign Legion, with the rank of lieutenant-colonel . 

On 5 September 1854, during the Crimean War, Vienot was appointed regimental commander. During April 1855, he led a vigorous attack by French and allied troops on the fortified works outside Sevastopol. 

During the night of 1-2 May 1855 Vienot launched an assault with his regiment on Fort Schwartz. The Russian defenders were overcome by the legionnaires, but Colonel Viénot was shot in the forehead while leading his men. During this assault fourteen of the eighteen legion officers involved were also killed in action.

Vienot was the second regimental commander of the French Foreign Legion to be killed in action while at the head of his men; after Colonel Conrad.

Posterity 
His name was given a couple of years after his death to the main garrison quarter of the Legion at Sidi bel-Abbès in French Algeria then in 1962, to the modern base of the 1st Foreign Regiment 1er RE, at Aubagne in France. 

He was chosen as the patron for the 2006-2008 promotion (graduation class) of St Cyr: Corniche Brutionne.

See also 
Origins of the French Foreign Legion
Marie Louis Henry de Granet-Lacroix de Chabrières
Patrice de MacMahon, Duke of Magenta
François Certain Canrobert
François Achille Bazaine
French Foreign Legion Music Band (MLE)

References

Sources 
 Répertoire des chefs de corps
 Centre de documentation de la Légion étrangère
 Répertoire des citations (BCAAM)

1804 births
1855 deaths
People from Fontainebleau
Officers of the French Foreign Legion
French military personnel of the Crimean War
French military personnel killed in action